The Sibling Society is a book by the poet, activist and author Robert Bly, published in 1996. Bly argues that modern men face difficulties caused by an inability to reach full maturity and discusses the consequences this has for the societies in which they live. The core of Bly's thesis seems to be derived from Alexander Mitscherlich's 1963 monograph, Society without the Father (Auf dem Weg zur vaterlosen Gesellschaft), for which Bly wrote an introduction to the American edition.

References

1996 non-fiction books
American non-fiction books
Books by Robert Bly
Gender studies books